The Umbrellas of Cherbourg is a 1964 musical romantic drama film written and directed by Jacques Demy, with music and lyrics by Michel Legrand. Catherine Deneuve and Nino Castelnuovo star as two young lovers in the French city of Cherbourg, separated by circumstance. The film's dialogue is entirely sung as recitative, including casual conversation, and is sung-through, or through-composed, like some operas and stage musicals. It has been seen as the middle part of an informal "romantic trilogy" of Demy films that share some of the same actors, characters, and overall look, coming after Lola (1961) and before The Young Girls of Rochefort (1967). The French-language film was a co-production between France and West Germany.

The Umbrellas of Cherbourg won the Palme d'Or at the 1964 Cannes Film Festival. In the United States, it was nominated for five Academy Awards, including Best Foreign-Language Film, Best Original Screenplay (Demy), and Best Original Score (Demy and Legrand). The film's main theme, "I Will Wait for You", was nominated for Best Original Song. It was later adapted into an English-language stage musical.

In 2018, a BBC Culture critics' poll ranked the film in the Top 100 Greatest Non-English Films of All Time.

Plot

Part One: The Departure (November 1957)

Madame Émery and her beautiful 17-year-old daughter Geneviève have a tiny, struggling umbrella boutique in the coastal town of Cherbourg in Normandy. Guy is a handsome young auto mechanic who lives with and cares for his sickly aunt and godmother Élise. Though Geneviève's mother disapproves, Guy and Geneviève are deeply in love; they plan to marry and name their first child Françoise. At the same time, Madeleine, a quiet young woman who looks after Guy's aunt, is secretly in love with Guy.

Guy is drafted to serve in the Algerian War. The night before he leaves, he and Geneviève pledge their undying love and have sex, perhaps for the first time.

Part Two: The Absence (January–April 1958)
Geneviève learns she is pregnant and writes to Guy, but his replies are sporadic. Her mother tells her to give up on Guyhe has forgotten her. Geneviève is courted by Roland Cassard, a kind, young, very wealthy Parisian jeweler; he wants to marry her despite her pregnancy. In one of the connections among Demy's trilogy of films, Roland had previously unsuccessfully wooed the title character in the earlier Lola (1961); now he relates a version of this story to Madame Émery. Madame Émery urges Geneviève to be sensible and choose a secure future with Roland. Roland announces that he will be going to Amsterdam for three months, and will wait for Geneviève's answer until his return. Geneviève marries Roland in a great cathedral, but she appears ambivalent about her decision.

Part Three: The Return (March 1959December 1963)
Returning injured from the war, Guy learns that Geneviève has married and left Cherbourg. He has a difficult time readjusting to civilian life. After an argument with his boss he quits his job, goes drinking in a seedy bar, and spends the night with a prostitute. When he returns to his apartment, Madeleine tells him that his aunt Élise has died.

Guy sees that Madeleine loves him, and he rebuilds his life with her help. Using the inheritance from his aunt he opens a new "American-style" gas station. Madeleine agrees to marry him, though she wonders whether he is merely on the rebound after losing Geneviève.

Four years later, on a snowy Christmas Eve, Guy and Madeleine are in the office of their gas station with their small son François. Madeleine is decorating a Christmas tree. They appear a loving, happy family. As Madeleine and François leave to visit Santa Claus, an expensive car pulls in. The mink-clad driver is Geneviève, now wealthy and sophisticated. She has a young girl with her. As Guy rounds the car to Geneviève's window their eyes meet and there is a moment of awkwardness.

Guy invites Geneviève into the warmth of the station's office, where they chat as a boy attends to Geneviève's car. This is Geneviève's first time in Cherbourg since her marriage, she tells him; her mother died recently. Looking outside at the girl in the car, Guy asks, "What did you name her?" Geneviève answers, "Françoise. She's a lot like you. Do you want to see her?" Guy shakes his head.

The car is ready. At the door Geneviève pauses and asks, "Are you doing well?" Guy replies, "Yes, very well." She opens the door and pulls her collar tight against the cold before looking back at Guy one last time. She walks to her car, gets in, and drives off. Madeleine returns with François, and Guy greets her with a kiss. As the camera pulls back, he frolics with his son in the snow, then picks him up and follows Madeleine inside as red warning lights flash in the foreground.

Cast

The majority of the principal actors' voices were dubbed.

Framing
Umbrellas is the middle film in an informal "romantic trilogy" of Demy films that share some of the same actors, characters, and overall look; it comes after Lola (1961) and before The Young Girls of Rochefort (1967). The film was very successful in France, and was also shown internationally, introducing Deneuve to a larger audience. It was nominated for several Academy Awards, including for Best Foreign Film, Best Song, Best Soundtrack, and Best Original Screenplay. It won three awards at the 1964 Cannes Film Festival, including its top prize, the Palme d'Or. Jim Ridley has called Cherbourg "the most affecting of movie musicals, and perhaps the fullest expression of [Demy's] career-long fascination with the entwining of real life, chance, and the bewitching artifice of cinematic illusion."

Music
The continuous music score and the brightly coloured photography had much to do with the popularity of this film. Formally the work is operatic, with the plot advanced entirely through dialogue sung with accompanying music. The colour photography is bright and vivid. The whole is united by an orchestral score of simple rhythms and tunes that are integrated with the story covering five years.

Since the cast were not trained singers, most of the actors' voices were dubbed and lipsynced:

The film score established composer Michel Legrand's reputation in Hollywood. He later scored other films, winning three Oscars. In North America, two of the film's songs became hits and were recorded by many artists: "I Will Wait for You" (the main theme, also known as "Devant le garage") and "Watch What Happens" (originally "Recit de Cassard", "Cassard's Story"). Both were given new English lyrics by lyricist Norman Gimbel.

Covers of "Watch What Happens" include ones by Tony Bennett, Ed Ames, and jazz pianist Oscar Peterson.

Reception and legacy 
The film was met with critical acclaim, and is now regarded as one of the best movie musicals of all time. Review aggregation website Rotten Tomatoes gives it a score of 97% based on reviews from 69 critics with an average rating of 8.8/10, judging it "Certified fresh" with the site's consensus: "Jacques Demy elevates the basic drama of everyday life into a soaring opera full of bittersweet passion and playful charm, featuring a timeless performance from Catherine Deneuve."

In a review for Empire magazine, Kim Newman awarded the film 5/5 stars and praised the "depths of operatic emotion under the hum-along singspiel" delivered by the films leads. Nigel Andrews, writing for the Financial Times awarded the film 4 stars out of 5 calling the film "a body of work slim but exquisitely styled". Kevin Maher for The Times, in a review of a re-release of the film in 2019, also lauded the film, awarding it 5/5 stars. Significant praise has also been directed to the entirely sung through nature of the film, with both James Berardinelli of reelviews and Roger Ebert of the Chicago Sun-Times praising this aspect of the film in their reviews.

Some critics noted that the plot is similar to Marcel Pagnol's trilogy of plays entitled Marius, Fanny and César. The musical Fanny was based on Pagnol's trilogy.

A restored digital version of Umbrellas of Cherbourg was shown as part of the Cannes Classics section of the 2013 Cannes Film Festival.

Director Damien Chazelle listed it as one of his favorite films, and as a major influence on his 2016 musical La La Land.

Accolades
 
 Prix Louis-Delluc, 1963
 Palme d'Or at the 1964 Cannes Film Festival
 Critics' prize for Best Film, by the French Syndicate of Film Critics, 1965
 Nominated for the Academy Award for Best Foreign Language Film at the 37th Academy Awards in 1965
 Nominated for four more Academy Awards at the 38th Academy Awards held in 1966, three for Legrand and Demy: Best Song (for "I Will Wait For You"), Best Original Score, Best Scoring - Adaptation or Treatment, and Best Screenplay Written Directly for the Screen. It did not win any.

Stage adaptation
In 1979, an English-language stage adaptation, with lyrics translated by Sheldon Harnick, premiered at the Public Theater in New York City.

In 2005 a major revision by Harnick was produced at the Two River Theatre Company in Red Bank, New Jersey.  Musical director/conductor Nathan Hurwitz provided new orchestration.  The cast included Max von Essen as Guy, Heather Spore as Genevieve, and Maureen Silliman as Madame Émery. Other cast members included Ken Krugman, Patti Perkins, Robyn Payne, Jonathan Kaplan, Steven Stein Grainger, Brett Rigby, and Sara Delaney.  Direction was by artistic director Jonathan Fox and choreography was by Ginger Thatcher.

In 2011, the Kneehigh Theatre Company in London presented the musical, starring Joanna Riding as Madame Émery, cabaret artist Meow Meow as the Maîtresse, and Andrew Durand as Guy. The production was directed by Emma Rice. It was given tryouts at Leicester's Curve Theatre from 11 to 26 February 2011 and began previews in the West End at the Gielgud Theatre from 5 March, officially opening on 22 March. It was due to run until October 2011, but closed on 21 May 2011.

The West End cast:

Restoration
The film version released in 2004 on DVD by Koch-Lorber Films is a completely restored version of the original.

The film was originally shot on Eastman negative stock, which had rapidly faded and thus had become almost unusable. The various copies of the film used in the cinema circuit gradually lost their quality. Umbrellas thus could not be seen with the rich colours which Demy had originally intended.

Knowing as he did that the Eastman stock would fade over time, Demy had made the three main yellow, cyan and magenta color separation masters on black-and-white negative films, which do not fade. These black-and-white separations had greater longevity.

In the 1990s, Demy's wife, film director Agnès Varda, headed a project to create a new colour-negative film from the three black and white separations. Restored full-color prints were made from this in 2004. The resulting film recaptured Demy's vision of a fantastically colourful Cherbourg.

Composer Michel Legrand assisted in restoring the original four-track stereo sound masters to digital. He remastered his score to produce a higher-quality version, released in 2014.

A digital version of the film was released on Blu-ray by Ciné Tamaris in 2013, on the 50th anniversary of its original release. This version was restored independently of the 2004 version with colour grading supervised by Demy's son Mathieu Demy.

Les Bicyclettes de Belsize

The title of the film inspired a musical short subject, released in 1969 and titled Les Bicyclettes de Belsize, which essentially parodied it. Douglas Hickox directed the said short subject, and Les Reed and Barry Mason composed the music and wrote the lyrics to its title song, French and English versions of which charted in 1969 for Mireille Mathieu and Engelbert Humperdinck respectively.

See also

 List of submissions to the 37th Academy Awards for Best Foreign Language Film
 List of French submissions for the Academy Award for Best Foreign Language Film

Notes

References

Further reading

Articles
 A.B. (February 26, 1965). "Movies: Les Parapluies de Cherbourg". McGill Daily Panorama. p. 11
 "Newcomers Lead Noteworthy Film". The Valley News. April 4, 1965  p. 49
 McNear, Bette (July 8, 1965). "French Saves Over-Hued 'Umbrellas'". The Evening Journal. p. 29
 "Max Pierre Schaeffer: 'Sie werden es nicht für möglich halten'". Quick. February 12, 1969. p. 41

Books
 Deutsches Bühnen-Jahrbuch, Volume 71. Druck und Kommissionverlag F.A. Günther & Sohn. 1963.
 Lebon, Eric Antoine (2018). Léonide Moguy: Un citoyen du monde au pays du cinéma. Paris: L'Harmattan. p. 9. .

External links
 
 
 
 
 Chicago Reader Review
 The Umbrellas of Cherbourg West End Musical
The Umbrellas of Cherbourg: A Finite Forever an essay by Jim Ridley at the Criterion Collection

1964 films
1960s French-language films
1960s musical drama films
1964 romantic drama films
1960s romantic musical films
1979 musicals
Films adapted into plays
Films directed by Jacques Demy
Films scored by Michel Legrand
Films set in 1957
Films set in 1958
Films set in 1959
Films set in 1963
Films set in Normandy
Films shot in Normandy
French musical drama films
French romantic drama films
French romantic musical films
German musical drama films
German romantic drama films
German romantic musical films
Louis Delluc Prize winners
Palme d'Or winners
Sung-through musical films
West German films
1960s French films
1960s German films
French pregnancy films
German pregnancy films